Frederick Foster (23 March 1882 – 19 June 1956) was a Jamaican cricketer. He played in eight first-class matches for the Jamaican cricket team from 1901 to 1925.

See also
 List of Jamaican representative cricketers

References

External links
 

1882 births
1956 deaths
Jamaican cricketers
Jamaica cricketers
People from Clarendon Parish, Jamaica